Season 2012–13 sees Greenock Morton compete in their sixth consecutive season in the First Division, having finished 8th in the 2011–12 season. Morton will also compete in the Challenge Cup, Scottish League Cup and the Scottish Cup.

Story of the season

May
Paul Di Giacomo, Colin Stewart, Stuart McCaffrey, Darren McGeouch, Ross Forsyth, Grant Evans, Marc Smyth, Andy Jackson, Matthew McGinley and Iain Flannigan left the club after their contracts expired. Mark McLaughlin was the first to be brought in to begin the rebuilding process.

Joel Kasubandi and Creag Little were released while Fouad Bachirou stated he would not re-sign, Lewis Hawke and Martin Maguire were offered unpaid reserve contracts, and Andy Graham, Thomas O'Ware, Derek Young, Peter MacDonald, Archie Campbell and Peter Weatherson were asked to re-sign. Winger David O'Brien signed on for another season.

Willie Dyer signed on a free transfer from Raith Rovers, and Archie Campbell re-signed to the club.

Thomas O'Ware signed his new one-year contract, as did Peter Weatherson. Weatherson also agreed to take over as a coach of one of the club's youth sides.

Morton signed Scotland youth international Jason Naismith on loan from St Mirren. Former Scotland U19 international Stephen Stirling signed a pre-contract to join when his Stranraer contract expired in June.

London-based Danshell became the new sponsor of the Morton youth academy, in a £10,000 one-year deal.

June
David Hopkin was brought in to work as co-manager of the reserve side alongside Jonatan Johansson.

Morton made their fifth signing of the season, bringing in young Motherwell fullback Jordan Halsman on a free transfer.

Andy Graham rejected the club's contract offer and signed for Dumbarton, along with Ross Forsyth who has been released in May.

As they did last season, Morton brought in Graeme Jones as a sports scientist on a consultancy basis during the off-season period.

Morton were given a home tie in the First Round of the Scottish League Challenge Cup against Albion Rovers.

Moore revealed that it was unlikely that captain Derek Young would re-sign with the club as "his kids and his wife are still up in Aberdeen".

The fixtures were released on 18 June, with Morton starting off at home to Livingston on 11 August.

Peter MacDonald signed a new one-year deal at the club, and goalkeeper Derek Gaston was signed as back-up to Alan Combe from Albion Rovers.

Ex-Dunfermline winger David Graham was signed on 20 June.

Morton agreed to send a side to Campbeltown to play the local amateur side, Campbeltown Pupils on 11 July.

A home friendly against Kilmarnock, and a closed doors game against Rapid București was organised.

Simon Mensing and Kyle Wilkie were taken on trial after being released by Hamilton Accies. Tony Wallace was also on trial, and Moore expected to sign him within the next week.

July
Tony Wallace completed his transfer to Cappielow for an undisclosed nominal fee.

Morton also have Craig Reid and Martin Hardie on trial, with the latter scoring in a 1-0 friendly win over Albion Rovers. Reid signed on 14 July.

Reid, Hardie and ex-Hibs fullback Scott Taggart signed for the club.

Morton were drawn away to East Stirlingshire in the first round of the Scottish Communities League Cup.

Kevin Rutkiewicz accepted a contract offer after playing in two trial matches for the club, and signed on 27 July.

Kyle Wilkie would sign up on 30 July 2012.

August
After dispatching of East Stirlingshire in the first round, Morton were given a home tie against Aberdeen in the second round.

Morton re-signed Fouad Bachirou on 17 August in time for him to make his second début against Hamilton Accies.

After only a couple of months, Johansson left the club to become U20 coach at Motherwell.

David Hutton signed a short-term deal at the club as understudy to Derek Gaston.

September
Alan Combe left to become a coach at Tynecastle with Hearts.

After not being able to play all season up to this point, Peter MacDonald was ruled out for a further six weeks due to having surgery on his plantar fascia.

Morton brought in ex-Celtic youth Liam Gormley on trial, and he scored in his first match against Largs Thistle.

With a 3–2 defeat of Airdrie United, Morton won four straight league games for the first time since the 1995–96 season.

October
Morton entered the Scottish Cup in the third round draw, and received an away tie at Albion Rovers who they defeated in the Challenge Cup earlier in the season.

Archie Campbell was awarded the SFL Young Player of the Month award and the Irn-Bru Ginger Boot as top scorer in the SFL for September.

November
Allan Moore received the October SFL Manager of the Month award, as Archie Campbell this time picked up the SFL Player of the Month award to add to his double of awards for September.

Morton defeated Albion Rovers in a replay to set up a fourth round tie against Highland Football League side Turriff United.

After eight consecutive wins, Morton's reserves ("the Bomb Squad") drew their first game of the season against Airdrie United.

December
Morton avoided the embarrassment of losing to Turriff when Peter Weatherson earned them a replay at Cappielow in the fourth round of the Scottish Cup. The replay was postponed at the first attempt due to a frozen pitch.

Morton won the replay 6–0 to set up a fifth round tie against Premier League Dundee.

Three youth players went out on loan to junior sides; Iain Beattie to Neilston Juniors, Martin Maguire to Port Glasgow and Euan Blair to Hurlford United.

January
Morton started the year badly, going down to a 3–0 defeat at home to strugglers Dumbarton.

David Hutton signed an extension to stay with the club to the end of the season.

Aidan Fulton went on a week-long trial at Motherwell's U20 side who are managed by former Morton coach Jonatan Johansson.

Allan Moore again won the dreaded SFL Manager of the Month award for December.

Morton signed Colin McMenamin with the help of local company McGill's Bus Services.

Youngster Declan McDaid received the first Morton call-up for many years when he was selected to represent Scotland Schools U18's at the 2013 Centenary Cup.

February
To allow him to get some first-team experience before heading to the United States for a scholarship, Lewis Hawke was released to allow him to sign on amateur terms at Annan Athletic.

Morton were hammered by Dundee in the Scottish Cup Fifth Round.

David Verlaque, whose father used to play for the club in the Scottish Premier Division, signed an amateur contract until the end of the season to play in the reserves.

Two Morton youth players received call-ups to try out for the Scotland U14 squad at the Excelsior Stadium in Airdrie; they were Lewis Strapp and Scott Miller.

Morton launched their social inclusion project, the Greenock Morton Community Trust, to get people in the local area involved in football at a young age.

March
As Morton suffered their first away league defeat since April 2012, Willie Dyer had to be taken from the field with a dislocated shoulder.

David Verlaque went on week long trial to Nottingham Forest.

Peter MacDonald won the player of the month for February.

April
Lewis Strapp rejected an approach from Celtic to stay at Morton's youth academy.

After Partick Thistle's victory on 20 April, they were confirmed as First Division champions; and Morton confirmed as league runners-up.

Michael Tidser was nominated for the PFA Scotland First Division Player of the Year award.

David Graham was released by Morton with two games still to go in the season.

Kevin Rutkiewicz and Jordan Halsman were released from their contracts to join Carolina RailHawks and Fram respectively.

May
Following a 4–1 defeat away at Falkirk, Morton finished the season in second place with 67 points. Peter MacDonald was the club's top scorer with 15 goals in all competitions.

First team transfers
From end of 2011–12 season, to last match of season 2012–13
Including unsigned trialists who appeared in first team matchday squads

In

Out

Squad (that played for first team)

Fixtures and results

Friendlies

Scottish Football League First Division

League position is after Morton game, not after round of games in case of postponements.

Scottish Cup

Scottish League Cup

Scottish Challenge Cup

Reserves

League table

Player statistics

All competitions
Additional positions played listed, if have started in more than one this season.

Awards

Last updated 26 April 2013

References

Greenock Morton F.C. seasons
Greenock Morton